Autarotis milvellus is a moth in the family Crambidae. It was described by Edward Meyrick in 1879. It is found in Australia, where it has been recorded from New South Wales.

References

Crambinae
Moths described in 1879
Moths of Australia
Taxa named by Edward Meyrick